Fu Bo may refer to:

 Fu Bo (football manager) (born 1965), Chinese football manager
 Fu Bo (film), a 2003 Hong Kong film

See also
 Ma Yuan (Han dynasty) (14 BC – 49 AD), known by official title Fubo Jiangjun